Stomp Off Let's Go is an album by American jazz saxophonist Sonny Stitt, featuring performances recorded in 1976 for the Flying Dutchman label.

Reception

In his review for AllMusic, Scott Yanow stated, "this is an average although enjoyable Sonny Stitt bop date".

Track listing
 "Samba de Orpheo" (Luiz Bonfá, Antônio Maria) - 7:45  
 "Duke's Place" (Duke Ellington, Bob Thiele, Bill Katts, Ruth Roberts) - 8:54  
 "Perdido" (Juan Tizol, Ervin Drake, Hans Lengsfelder) - 11:52  
 "Little Suede Shoes" (Charlie Parker) - 7:50

Personnel
Sonny Stitt - tenor saxophone, alto saxophone
Jon Faddis, Lew Soloff - trumpet
Frank Owens - electric piano
Bucky Pizzarelli - guitar
Richard Davis - electric bass 
Louis Bellson - drums 
Leopoldo Fleming - percussion (tracks 1, 2 & 4)

References

1976 albums
Albums produced by Bob Thiele
Flying Dutchman Records albums
Sonny Stitt albums